Guilt by Association Vol. 4 is a compilation album released July 8, 2016 by Team Mensch. Like its previous installments, Guilt by Association Vol. 1, Guilt by Association Vol. 2 and Guilt by Association Vol. 3, Guilt By Association Vol. 4 features indie rock artists covering popular songs.

Overview
In this, the fourth in the series of compilations, Guilt by Association Vol. 4 features indie rock artists, including Chris Collingwood, Mike Doughty and Rachael Yamagata, covering their favorite songs.  The theme of this album is that all the songs are covers of songs from 1966.

Track listing

See also
Guilt by Association Vol. 1
Guilt by Association Vol. 2
Guilt by Association Vol. 3

References

External links
Official website by Team Mensch
Official Facebook fanpage

2016 compilation albums
Covers albums